Candid Eye is a Canadian documentary television series which aired on CBC Television in 1958 and was expanded into 1961.

Production

Wolf Koenig, Terence Macartney-Filgate, and Stanley Jackson filmed The Days Before Christmas in December 1957, and the Canadian Broadcasting Corporation and National Film Board requested six more episodes after seeing it. The Days Before Christmas was later released in December 1958, while Blood and Fire aired as the first episode on 26 October 1958.

Tom Daly served as the executive producer. Multiple names were suggested for the show, including The Roving Eye, but Candid Eye was selected, despite fears that it would be confused with Candid Camera.

Candid Eye, influenced by British Free Cinema films and the work of Henri Cartier-Bresson, was one of the NFB's very first experiments in Cinéma vérité. The films were observational, shot on location using the NFB's new mobile, light-weight equipment. Only Festival in Puerto Rico had a script, and Pilgrimage, The Days Before Christmas, Police, and Blood and Fire involved large crowds. The Back-Breaking Leaf and Country Threshing were shot in fields; The Cars in Your Life, using slow-motion and pop-on-pop-off photography, was shot, in part, on a highway. The series has been credited as helping to inspire the Cinéma vérité documentary movement.

The show was successful--Blood and Fire won a Canadian film award and an American television award. (Later, The Back-Breaking Leaf would win the Eurovision Grand Prix at the Cannes Film Festival.) Six additional episodes were requested, although they would air under the name Documentary '60 after the CBC asked the NFB to rebrand Candid Eye, Frontiers, and The World in Action into one show. The Candid Eye is now classified as one 14-film series.

Episodes

References

Works cited

External links
 
 Candid Eye at the National Film Board of Canada

CBC Television original programming
1950s Canadian documentary television series
1958 Canadian television series debuts
1958 Canadian television series endings
Black-and-white Canadian television shows
National Film Board of Canada documentary series